The following is a list of media outlets in Winnipeg, Manitoba, Canada. Such outlets can include newspapers, radio and television stations, and online media operating in and serving Winnipeg and/or the Winnipeg Metro Region.

Active in Winnipeg are various local, national, and international media outlets; local outlets also include neighbourhood and ethnic media.

Print media

Daily newspapers

Ethnic print media

Periodical newspapers
Official student papers

Community papers

Canstar Community Newspapers, owned by FP Canadian Newspapers LP, owns and operates several free community newspapers within the Winnipeg area, published weekly.

Magazines

Television
Most homes subscribe to cable television through Shaw Communications, or internet protocol through Bell MTS. There are also two satellite services available through Shaw Direct and Bell Satellite TV. Some homes use grey market satellite dishes to bring in signals from American satellite services.

Free programming 
There are five English-language stations and one French-language station based in Winnipeg that supply free programming to the city.

American networks 
Additionally, American network affiliates broadcasting from Fargo and Grand Forks, North Dakota are available over-the-air in many parts of Winnipeg and Southern Manitoba. Until the mid-1980s, KRDK-TV (then known as KXJB) and KVLY-TV (then known as KTHI) from Fargo were available on Winnipeg's cable service. These channels were replaced by WDIV-TV and WJBK from Detroit, later WTOL from Toledo. Currently, WCCO-TV and KARE from Minneapolis, Minnesota are available to Winnipeg via cable. WDAZ-TV from Grand Forks is still available on Winnipeg cable TV systems.

For decades, the Fargo/Grand Forks stations depended heavily on advertising in Winnipeg, as Winnipeg has more than double the population of the Fargo/Grand Forks market. WUHF, the Fox-affiliate from Rochester, New York, has been available on cable since December 1994.  Fargo Fox affiliate KVRR operates a repeater, KNRR, in border town Pembina, North Dakota; it reaches Winnipeg over-the-air.  However, its weak signal requires either a rooftop VHF antenna aimed south or being located on a high floor of a tall building.

KNRR was intended to target Winnipeg, but is not carried on any Winnipeg-area systems due to Canadian Radio-television and Telecommunications Commission concerns that Winnipeg businesses will advertise on KNRR rather than Winnipeg stations. Ironically, some Winnipeg businesses advertise on WDAZ, which is carried on cable TV in Winnipeg, as many Winnipeg residents shop in Grand Forks (and Fargo) to take advantage of lower taxes. However this is sometimes ineffective due to simultaneous substitution. This practice requires cable systems to replace WDAZ's signal with that of a Winnipeg station (usually either CKY or CKND) whenever the same program and episode air simultaneously.

The PBS member network for North Dakota, Prairie Public Television, has been carried on Winnipeg cable systems for over four decades by way of its Grand Forks outlet, KGFE.  Winnipeg is almost as large as the entire American population of Prairie Public's footprint, and has long been a significant supporter of the network.

Cable television

Radio
Winnipeg is home to 24 AM and FM radio stations, the most popular of which has been, for many years, CJOB—a talk-oriented AM station popular for its coverage of major storms and floods. After an absence of many years, Winnipeg is now home to two English-language and one French-language campus radio stations. NCI is devoted to Aboriginal programming, and CKJS is devoted to ethnic programming. CBC Radio One and CBC Music broadcast local and national programming, and two Radio-Canada stations also broadcast French programming. There are several rock and pop oriented stations, two country stations, and one tourist information station.

Defunct
In 1922, George Melrose Bell, from Calgary, was licensed to launch a radio station in Winnipeg known as CKZC-AM. However, the license would expire and the station never made it to air, as Bell would be too preoccupied in launching stations in Calgary and Regina. Another defunct station, CKZC, was launched by Lynn V. Salton (1897-1956) in 1922. Salton later became the radio operator for the Winnipeg Free Press' radio station that operated until 1923 .

On January 23, 2012, the CRTC ruled that campus radio stations in Canada could no longer use students as on-air DJs, and instead would follow the definition of a community radio station. Red River College's CKIC would be the first station to be forced off the air as result of this decision. At 4 PM on July 4, 2012, the station shut down its operation as an over-the-air broadcaster and turned in the corresponding license to the CRTC. The station would later plan to return to the air as an internet-only radio station, beginning in the Fall of 2012.

Online media

Podcasts
Podcast networks in Winnipeg:

 The Garbage Hill Podcast Network — Winnipeg's first independent podcast network.
 Manitoba Podcast Network — A collection of locally produced online shows. Subjects include film, pop culture, craft beer, video games, etc.

Ethnic media

National media in Winnipeg 
Various national/international media outlets base their Manitoba branches/newsrooms out of Winnipeg. These include:

 CBC/Radio-Canada (CBC Manitoba / ICI Manitoba)
 CityTV / CityNews (CityTV Winnipeg / CityNews Winnipeg)
 CTV (CTV Winnipeg) — #1 broadcaster in Manitoba
 Global News (Global Winnipeg)
 Prairie Public Broadcasting
 The Western Producer — agricultural publication

See also
Media of Canada

References

Winnipeg
 
Winnipeg-related lists